Yuliya Vladimirovna Pakhalina (born 12 September 1977) is a Russian diver. She won the gold medal in the 2000 Summer Olympics in the 3m Synchronized Springboard with partner Vera Ilyina.

Biography 

Yuliya Pakhalina was born in Penza. In 1994 she graduated from Penza Secondary School No. 28. In the same year she was awarded the title of World-Class Master of Sports. 

She graduated from the Faculty of Physical Education Penza State University.

She moved to Houston, Texas before the 2000 Summer Olympics to train with her partner Vera Ilyina, under the direction of Head Coach Jane Figuiredo (University of Houston) and competed for the University of Houston's swimming and diving team. The two divers trained at the Woodland's Pool several times.

References

External links
UH Cougars profile

1977 births
Living people
Penza State University alumni
Russian female divers
Olympic divers of Russia
Divers at the 2000 Summer Olympics
Divers at the 2004 Summer Olympics
Divers at the 2008 Summer Olympics
Olympic gold medalists for Russia
Olympic silver medalists for Russia
Olympic bronze medalists for Russia
University of Houston alumni
Sportspeople from Penza
Olympic medalists in diving
Medalists at the 2008 Summer Olympics
Medalists at the 2004 Summer Olympics
Medalists at the 2000 Summer Olympics
Universiade medalists in diving
Universiade gold medalists for Russia
Medalists at the 1999 Summer Universiade